Openware, Inc. (previously known as France-based Openware S.A.S.) is a United States multinational open-source Blockchain software engineering company headquartered in South San Francisco, California. It developed a complete digital asset and cryptocurrency exchange framework based on its expertise in financial DevOps, network security, open-source integration, and assistance to international companies, banks, and service providers.

History 
Openware, Inc. was founded in 2006 with the name Heilos Technologies. In 2017, Helios picked up abandonware Peatio and changed it into Openware with a blockchain engagement.

In December 2021, Openware merged with Yellow.com  to create a global settlement network for their customers.

References

External links
 Official website

Software companies based in the San Francisco Bay Area
American companies established in 2006
Software companies established in 2006